Lord Nassau Powlett  (23 June 1698 – 24 August 1741) was an English army officer and politician who sat in the House of Commons from 1720 to 1734 and in 1741.

Powlett was the only son of Charles Powlett, 2nd Duke of Bolton by his third wife Henrietta Crofts a granddaughter of Charles II of England and his mistress Lucy Walter.

He joined the army and was a cornet in the 12th Dragoons in 1715, captain in the 6th Dragoon Guards in 1718 and in the Royal Horse Guards in 1721.

He was returned as Member of Parliament for Hampshire in a by-election on 22 June 1720 and held the seat until the 1727 general election. In 1725, he became one of the founder knights of the Order of the Bath. He was returned as MP for Lymington in 1727 and held the seat until 1734 when he did not stand again. He regained his seat at Lymington in the 1741 general election but died soon after on 24 August.

In 1731, he married Lady Isabella Tufton, daughter of Thomas Tufton, 6th Earl of Thanet.
Powlett's only child, a daughter Isabella Paulet (who died on 8 September 1821), married on 4 June 1765 John Perceval, 3rd Earl of Egmont.

References

Paulet genealogy

1698 births
1741 deaths
Knights Companion of the Order of the Bath
Members of the Parliament of Great Britain for English constituencies
Younger sons of dukes
British MPs 1715–1722
British MPs 1722–1727
British MPs 1727–1734
British MPs 1741–1747
Nassau
12th Royal Lancers officers
Royal Horse Guards officers